Slot is a Russian metal band. Members of the group that include Daria "Nookie" Stavrovich, Igor "Cache" Lobanov, Sergey "ID" Bogolyubsky, Nikita Muravyov, and Vasiliy «Ghost» Gorshkov.

Since its inception the group has released eight studio albums, two remix albums, two mini-albums, two live DVDs, recorded 20 singles, and contributed to several soundtracks. The Slot is known for its long tours of Russia and neighboring countries which sometimes last more than a year.

Biography

Slot was formed by male vocalist and chief songwriter Igor Lobanov (nicknamed Cache) and Denis Khromykh (nicknamed "Dan") in 2002 in Moscow, Russia. In 2003 they released their debut album "SLOT 1", released under Mistery Of Sound recording label. Their debut video "Odni" (Одни) was in rotation on MTV and other major video stations for over six months. The album went on to sell over ten thousand copies internationally. Despite their initial success, Teona Dolnikova left the band in 2004 due to further concentrate with her solo career.

Uliana Elina (nicknamed IF), the eventual winner of 2005 RAMP Awards Best Vocal of the Year became Slot's female vocalist from 2004 to 2006. Together with Korn, Slot performed at Saint Petersburg's Ice Palace and at MSA in Moscow in 2006.

The band have been featured on numerous soundtracks for films such as "Day Watch", "Pirate", "Bumer" and " Hunting for Piranha". They have also been featured on compilations such as Nashestvie, Scang Fest, and Rock Watch.

In the summer of 2006 Slot opened their Myspace page due to constant requests from fans worldwide. In the first month the band had received over 1000 visits and over 20,000 plays on Myspace player. Slot also has a page on Facebook and a YouTube channel.

In Autumn 2006, the band released their second studio album 2 Wars (2 войны), fuelled by the nationwide hit single of the same name. The video for the song was aired on various national television stations (MTV Russia, Muz-TV, A-One, O2TV and Music Box). The album shifted over eight thousand copies in the first twelve weeks of release.

Due to the success of their second album, the band were once again nominated for the RAMP Awards in four categories. Slot received the most nominations in 2006. They won the Hit of the Year award. 2 Wars was re-recorded and re-released in 2007, featuring their new vocalist Daria Stavrovich (nicknamed Nookie).

They have played with international rock bands such as Korn, Clawfinger, and Samael. In 2007 they performed alongside Aria at the RAMP Awards. The band embarked on a fifty-date tour of the Baltic region, where more than fifty thousand fans came out to support them in spring of 2007.

In fall of 2007 they released their third album Trinity (Тринити). The music video of the first single "Dead Stars" (Мёртвые Звёзды) was released to Internet and national video stations in the fourth quarter of 2007.

On 19 September 2009, Slot released their fourth studio album, which garnered attention from non-Russian speaking countries like United Kingdom, United States, and Canada. In March 2010, Slot released their first ever English single, "Mirrors" (Зеркала). With its release and accompanying music video both in Russian and in English, the band is finding an entire new layer of fans. In April 2010, the band released its first ever English maxi-single entitled, "Mirrors." This single will include newly recorded and remastered editions of "Mirrors," "Dead Stars," and "My Angel."

In 2011, Slot released Break the Code, their debut English album. It was released on 23 August. The special edition of this album was also released in Japan.

In early 2014, Slot released the crowd funded album Шестой Sixth. On 18 April 2014, Nookie was stabbed multiple times in her neck during an autograph session with their fans on a café in St. Petersburg. She was rushed to the hospital, where the doctors said that she was "moderately grave", but her life was not in danger.

On 28 August 2018, a collection of the best tracks 15 was released on CD for fans in Europe, America and Japan. The disc is released by Sliptrick Records under the license of M2BA label.

As special guests, Slot performed on the same stage with such Western performers as Korn, Limp Bizkit, Guano Apes, Mötley Crüe and Skillet.

Achievements 
Vocalist of the group – Daria Stavrovich - is semifinalist of the popular Russian broadcast "The Voice". Her performance of the song Cranberries "Zombie" has got over 33 million views on YouTube. Also Daria entered the list of "Hottest Chicks in Hard Rock" according to the most respected American magazine "Revolver".

The group plays at all major festivals. At their speech at the Nashestvie 2019 there were 30 thousand people. In addition to Russian festivals, they played at major festival in Slovakia named "Top fest".

The release of the album Break The Code in the US was preceded by the appearance on the radio of the single of the same name "Break the Code", which in just one week hit the rotation of 55 American radio stations and took second place in the rating of Metal Radio Station Add Chart.

Band members
Current members
Igor "Cache" Lobanov - vocals
Sergey "ID" Bogolyubsky- guitar
Daria "Nookie" Stavrovich - vocals
Nikita Muravyov - bass guitar
Vasilij Gorshkov - drums, percussion
Former members
Denis "Dan" Chromyk
Alexsej "Proff" Nazachuk
Teona "Teka" Dolnikova
Uljana "IF" Elina
Mikhail "mikhei4" Korolev
Mikhail "MiX" Petrov
Nikita "NiXon" Simonov
Kirill "Mr. Dude" Kachanov

Discography

Studio albums

Re-released albums

Remixes

Singles

DVD

Videography

OST and compilations 
2003 OST "Bumer"
2003 Compilation "Nashestvie XIV"
2004 Compilation "SCANG FEST 3"
2004 Compilation "Rock Maraphon"
2005 Compilation "RAMP 2005"
2006 OST "Piranha"
2006 Compilation "Russian Alternative" 2006
2007 OST "Shadowboxing 2: Revenge"
2007 OST "Half-Life: Paranoia" (Half-Life's modification)
2008 OST "Street Racers"
2008 OST "Black Hunters"
2011 OST "Shadowboxing 3: Last Round
2014 OST "Angel or Demon"
2014 OST "Ownership 18"

Awards 
RAMP Awards 2005 - Best Vocal of the Year (won with female vocalist Uliana "IF" Elina)
RAMP Awards 2006 - Hit of the Year (Won), Album of the year, Band of the year (Nominated)
RAMP Awards 2007 - Band of the Year (Nominated)
RAMP Awards 2008 - Clip of the Year (Nominated), Album of the Year (Nominated), Hit of the Year (Nominated), Soundtrack of the Year (Nominated), Band of the Year (Nominated)

References

External links 

Musical groups established in 2002
Musical groups from Moscow
Russian nu metal musical groups
Russian alternative rock groups
2002 establishments in Russia